Moily ministry was the Council of Ministers in Karnataka, a state in South India headed by M. Veerappa Moily that was formed after S. Bangarappa submitted resignation.

In the government headed by M. Veerappa Moily, the Chief Minister was from INC. Apart from the CM, there were Deputy Chief Minister and other ministers in the government.

Tenure of the Government 
In 1989, Indian National Congress emerged victorious and Veerendra Patil was elected as leader of the Party, hence sworn in as CM in 1989. A year later he submitted resignation and President's Rule was imposed and S. Bangarappa sworn in as Chief Minister later. In 1992 S. Bangarappa submitted resignation and M. Veerappa Moily was elected as CM and S. M. Krishna was picked as Deputy Chief Minister. The ministry was dissolved when Indian National Congress lost badly in 1994 elections and H. D. Deve Gowda became the Chief Minister.

Council of Ministers

Chief Minister and deputy Chief Minister

Cabinet Ministers

Minister of State 
If the office of a Minister is vacant for any length of time, it automatically comes under the charge of the Chief Minister.

See also 

 Karnataka Legislative Assembly

References

External links 

 Council of Ministers

Cabinets established in 1992
1992 establishments in Karnataka
Moily
1994 disestablishments in India
Cabinets disestablished in 1994
1992 in Indian politics
Indian National Congress state ministries